Ellen David is a Canadian actress. She was co-nominated for a 2007 Gemini Award for Best Ensemble Performance in a Comedy Program or Series in The Business episode Check Please and nominated for a 2005 Prix Gemeaux for Meilleur rôle de soutien féminin : comédie (Best supporting actress : comedy). She also won the Award of Excellence from the Montreal chapter of the ACTRA Awards in 2015 for her body of work.

Career 
Her other roles include Tripping the Rift, Arthur, The Little Lulu Show, Mambo Italiano, Law & Order, Ciao Bella, Naked Josh, For Better or For Worse, Mona the Vampire, Simon in the Land of Chalk Drawings, Postcards from Buster, Animal Crackers, Fred's Head, Are You Afraid of the Dark?, Pig City, Daft Planet, What's with Andy?, Splinter Cell, The Mystery Files of Shelby Woo, Sirens, Largo Winch, 2001: A Space Travesty, A Walk on the Moon, Random Encounter, Afterglow, Moose TV, Caillou, Princess Sissi, Ripley's Believe It or Not!, Lucky Luke, The Country Mouse and the City Mouse Adventures, Spaced Out, Billy and Buddy, Marsupilami, Wunschpunsch, Edward, A Miss Mallard Mystery, Winx Club, Prudence Gumshoe, Pet Pals, Creepschool, The Kids from Room 402, Kitou, Tupu, Shaolin Kids, The Bellflower Bunnies, Fred the Caveman, Jim Button, X-DuckX, My Goldfish is Evil, Lola and Virginia, The Tofus, Potatoes and Dragons, Tommy and Oscar, Nunavut, Dragon Hunters, Mica, Wombat City, Gene Fusion, Iron Nose, Martin Morning, Kit and Kaboodle, Okura, Pinocchio 3000, Deadbolt, Barney's Version, Urban Angel, Scent of Murder, Going to Kansas City, Fatal Affair, Street Legal, Night Heat and 18 to Life.

She is a graduate of Wagar High School. Her voice can be heard on the PBS series Sagwa, the Chinese Siamese Cat as Mama Miao.

Filmography

Film

Television

Video games

References

External links 
 

Canadian film actresses
Canadian television actresses
Canadian voice actresses
Living people
Actresses from Montreal
Anglophone Quebec people
Year of birth missing (living people)
20th-century Canadian actresses
21st-century Canadian actresses